Disappear is a studio album by the American hardcore punk band T.S.O.L., released in 2001 through Nitro Records.

Critical reception
The Los Angeles Times called the album a return to "a classic punk sound full of high-octane, slashing guitars." AllMusic wrote that "the album may be titled Disappear, but TSOL have in reality reappeared in all its former glory." Trouser Press called the band "as stylistically ravenous as ever," but wrote that the album contained "too much filler from a band that’s had so long to prepare."

Track listing

Personnel
Band
Jack Grisham – vocals, piano
Ron Emory – guitar; lead vocals on "In My Head"
Mike Roche – bass guitar
Jay O'Brien – drums

Additional musicians
Pat O'Leary – backing vocals on "In My Head"
Alan Morphew – trumpet on "Socialite"

Production
Thom Wilson – producer, recording engineer
Kris Stencel – layout and design

References

T.S.O.L. albums
2001 albums